Les Misérables is a 1925 French silent film directed by Henri Fescourt, based on the 1862 novel of the same name by Victor Hugo.

Plot summary

Cast
 Gabriel Gabrio as Jean Valjean
 Paul Jorge as Monseigneur Myriel
 Sandra Milovanoff as Fantine and Cosette
 Andrée Rolane as Cosette (child)
 Jean Toulout as Javert
 François Rozet as Marius
 Paul Guidé as Enjolras
 Charles Badiole as Gavroche
 Maillard as Gillenormand
 Clara Darcey-Roche as Mlle Baptistine
 Georges Saillard as Thénardier
 Suzanne Nivette as Éponine (as Nivette Saillard)
 Renée Carl as La Thénardier
 Émilien Richard as Bamatabois (as Émilien Richaud) 
 Marcelle Barry as Mme Victorine (uncredited) 
 Gilbert Dacheux as Le domestique (uncredited) 
 Luc Dartagnan as Pontmercy (uncredited) 
 Sylviane de Castillo as Soeur Simplice (uncredited) 
 Victor Dujeu as Fauchelevent (uncredited) 
 Jeanne Marie-Laurent as Mme Magloire (uncredited) 
 Jeanne Méa as Mlle Gillenormand (uncredited)

See also
 Adaptations of Les Misérables

References

External links
 
 
 

1925 films
French silent feature films
French black-and-white films
Films based on Les Misérables
Films directed by Henri Fescourt
Pathé films
1920s French films